Giannis Alexoulis (born 22 April 1964) is a former Greek football player.

Career
He joined Larissa in 1982 from youth team, and stayed with the team until 1989, at which time he transferred to PAOK. He played with PAOK until 1992, when he returned to Larissa, He joined Ialysos the last team in his professional career, in 1996.

Personal
His daughter is the long jumper Haido Alexouli.

Honours 
AEL Larissa
 Greek Championship: 1988
 Greek Cup: 1985

References

1964 births
Living people
Greek footballers
Association football midfielders
Athlitiki Enosi Larissa F.C. players
PAOK FC players